This is a list of yearly National Association of Intercollegiate Athletics (NAIA) Division II independents football records.

NAIA Division II standings

References

Independents
Standings